Heringita heringi is a moth of the family Autostichidae. It is found on the Balearic Islands in the Mediterranean and mainland Spain.

References

Moths described in 1953
Holcopogoninae